Ricky Brabec (born 21 April 1991) is an American professional off-road and rally raid motorcycle racer. He is prominent for being the first American competitor to win the motorcycle division of the Dakar Rally in 2020.

Biography 
Brabec was born in San Bernardino, California and started BMX when he was five years old. When he was 15, he and his family moved to the desert city of Hesperia, California. First trying motocross, Brabec began desert racing in 2011. 

In 2014, Brabec won the Baja 1000, Baja 500 and San Felipe 250. He was fifth in the bike category at Abu Dhabi Desert Challenge in 2015. In 2016, he was sixth at Merzouga Rally and seventh at Atacama Rally in the bike category. 

He made his Dakar Rally debut in 2016 and finished in 9th. In 2017, he won his first stage, but failed to finish the race. In 2018, he was running in 6th place when he was forced out of the race. It was the second time in his career that he retired from a race. In 2019, he retired for the third consecutive year. In 2020, he won the bike category and two stages.

Brabec also represented the United States at three International Six Days Enduro events. The International Six Days Enduro is a form of off-road motorcycle Olympics that is the oldest annual competition sanctioned by the FIM, dating back to 1913.

Career Results

Rally Dakar

Other results 

 Baja 1000
  2014 
 Baja 500
  2014 
 San Felipe 250
  2014 
 Abu Dhabi Desert Challenge
 5th 2015
 6th 2018
 Atacama Rally
 7th 2016 
 9th 2018
 6th 2019
 Merzouga Rally
 6th 2016 
Dakar Rally
  2020
 Rallye OiLibya du Maroc
  2017
  2018
 5th 2019

References 

1991 births
Living people
People from Hesperia, California
Sportspeople from San Bernardino, California
Dakar Rally motorcyclists
American motocross riders
Off-road motorcycle racers
Enduro riders
Dakar Rally winning drivers